Karlo Sakandelidze (April 1, 1928 – October 29, 2010) was a Georgian film and theatre actor.

Sakandelidze was born in Bzvani, Georgia.  He was an actor with the  Rustaveli Theatre. Sakandelidze's Important roles included Gogia (Losve Story), Gio (Tariel Golua), Osiko Kharebadze (The Autumn Nobles) Kuchara (Kvarkvare Tutaberi), Toshek (Such a Love), Chinchraka (Chinchraka), Butkhuza (The Old Pipers), Aristo Kvashavadze (The Stepmother of Samanaishvili), Peasant and Husband (The Caucasian Chalk Circle), Catesby (Richard III),  and Scrooge in (Christmas Dream).

Karlo Sakandelidze also acted in films. His first film was Magdanas Lurja (1955), directed by Tengiz Abuladze and Rezo Chkheidze, where he played the role of Vano. This film received a Golden Palm at the  Cannes film festival, for the best fiction film-short. Another important role for Sakandelidze was in the movie Data Tutashkhia, in which he played Nikandro Qiria.

He died in Tbilisi.

External links 
The Rustaveli State Academic Theatre website

Actors of Rustaveli State Theatre at the Parliament of Georgia website

1928 births
2010 deaths
Burials at Didube Pantheon
Male film actors from Georgia (country)
People's Artists of Georgia
Soviet male film actors
Recipients of the Order of Honor (Georgia)